The fourth season of House, also known as House, M.D., premiered on September 25, 2007 and ended May 19, 2008. Having previously fired Chase, and with Foreman and Cameron quitting, House starts a competition between 40 applicants for the vacant positions. He eventually narrows them down to seven, firing one each episode. In the episode "Games", he fires Amber "Cutthroat Bitch" Volakis (Anne Dudek), hiring Dr. Chris Taub (Peter Jacobson), Dr. Lawrence Kutner (Kal Penn) and Dr. Remy "Thirteen" Hadley (Olivia Wilde) as his new team. Dr. Foreman rejoins the team after his dismissal from another hospital. Meanwhile, Amber begins a relationship with Wilson.

When production of the season was interrupted by the 2007–2008 Writers Guild of America strike, the number of episodes was reduced to 16 instead of the planned 24. Executive producer Katie Jacobs explained that it was hard for the writers to finish the story arcs started during the season with eight fewer episodes. Season four also introduced seven actors to the cast; in addition to Jacobson, Penn, and Wilde, who became regulars, Andy Comeau portrayed Travis Brennan, an epidemiologist; Edi Gathegi played Jeffrey Cole, a geneticist; Carmen Argenziano appeared as Henry Dobson, a former medical school admissions officer; and Anne Dudek portrayed Amber "Cut-throat Bitch" Volakis, an interventional radiologist. Each of the four departed the show after elimination, except for Volakis, who remained recurring until the finale, having started a relationship with Wilson.

Cast and characters

Main cast 
 Hugh Laurie as Dr. Gregory House 
 Lisa Edelstein as Dr. Lisa Cuddy
 Omar Epps as Dr. Eric Foreman
 Robert Sean Leonard as Dr. James Wilson
 Jennifer Morrison as Dr. Allison Cameron
 Jesse Spencer as Dr. Robert Chase

Recurring cast 
 Peter Jacobson as Dr. Chris Taub
 Kal Penn as Dr. Lawrence Kutner
 Olivia Wilde as Dr. Remy 'Thirteen' Hadley
 Anne Dudek as Dr. Amber "Cutthroat Bitch" Volakis
 Edi Gathegi as Dr. Jeffrey "Big Love" Cole
 Andy Comeau as Dr. Travis "Grumpy" Brennan
 Carmen Argenziano as Henry "Scooter", "Bosley", Dobson
 Michael Michele as Dr. Samira Terzi
 Meera Simhan as Dr. Jody Desai
 Melinda Dahl as Doctor #15A
 Caitlin Dahl as Doctor #15B
 Kathryn Adams as Doctor #23
 Jennifer Crystal Foley as Rachel Taub
 Maurice Godin as Dr. Lawrence Hourani

Guest cast 
Michael Adler, Kristina Anapau, Julie Ariola, Essence Atkins, Rob Benedict, Eli Bildner, Joel Bissonnette, David Campbell, Matt DeCaro, Dan Desmond, Conor Dubin, Amy Dudgeon, Fred Durst, Laurie Fortier, Heather Fox, Jennifer Hall, Henry Hayashi, Jeff Hephner, Charlie Hofheimer, Brian Klugman, Caroline Lagerfelt, Kay Lenz, Jason Lewis, Liana Liberato, Nick McCallum, Ivana Miličević, Pat Millicano, Janel Moloney, Chad Morgan, Jason Manuel Olazabal, Holmes Osborne, Eyal Podell, Bevin Prince, Paul Rae, Jeremy Renner, Reynaldo Rosales, Jonathan Sadowski, Mary Kate Schellhardt, Azura Skye, Laura Silverman, Scott Alan Smith, Mira Sorvino, Douglas Spain, Anthony Starke, Khleo Thomas, Steve Valentine, Alex Weed, Frank Whaley, Michael Whaley, Chad Willett, Thomas F. Wilson, Tom Wright and Kathleen York.

Episodes

DVD releases

References 
General
 
 

Specific

Further reading

External links 

 
 House recaps at televisionwithoutpity.com
 House episodes information at film.com
 List of House episodes at TVGuide.com
 

 
2007 American television seasons
2008 American television seasons